Corythoichthys amplexus, known commonly as the brown-banded pipefish, is a species of marine fish in the family Syngnathidae.

Description

Anatomy
The brown-banded pipefish is a small size fish and can reach a maximum size of  length. The skin has a base colour of light tan with  broad reddish-brown bands on the body, each 3-4 rings wide, which lie across the side and dorsal surfaces, occasionally these are divided to form two closely set bands, and sometimes they are indistinct on the posterior third of the tail. The head lacks prominent stripes behind eye and the ventral surface of anterior trunk rings is blotched with dark brown in males, while often being marked with small paired spots in females.

Reproduction
The adult males and females form monogamous pairs, they are an ovoviviparous species, in which the males brood the fertilised eggs in a brood pouch situated under his tail. The brood pouch protects the dorsal surface and side of the egg mass, leaving the ventral surface exposed.
The eggs mass consists of 2–17 transverse rows within a gelatinous matrix.

Distribution and habitat
The brown-banded pipefish is widespread throughout the tropical waters of the Indo-West Pacific region, from the eastern coast of Africa to the western Pacific north to the Ryukyu Islands to south the Great Barrier Reef. Records from South Africa and Madagascar require verification. It is a secretive species which occurs in coral reefs, lagoons, harbours, and open sandy-flats; as well as in rubble along edges of reefs and in small patches of reef which are surrounded by sandy flats. It feeds on small crustaceans.

Human uses
They are traded for the aquarium trade and like other pipefishes and sea horses they may be dried and traded for traditional medicine and for sale as curios.

References

External links

 
 http://www.marinespecies.org/aphia.php?p=taxdetails&id=217996

amplexus
Taxa named by Charles Eric Dawson
Taxa named by John Ernest Randall
Fish described in 1975